Gisela Engeln-Müllges (born 1940) is a German mathematician and artist. She is a professor of numerical mathematics at the Aachen University of Applied Sciences, where she is also a former vice rector for research, development, and technology.

Education and academic career
Engeln-Müllges was born in Leipzig, in 1940. After World War II, Leipzig became part of East Germany (the German Democratic Republic), and Engeln-Müllges escaped to the west in 1961. She studied mathematics at RWTH Aachen University beginning in 1961, and completed a doctorate (Dr. rer. nat.) in 1971, with a dissertation Fluchtebenennomogramme zur Darstellung von Funktionensystemen: Ihre Theorie und praktische Verwendbarkeit concerning numerical analysis.

She has been a professor at the Aachen University of Applied Sciences since 1982, and was vice rector there from 1992 to 2005. With Frank Uhlig, she is the author of the books Numerik-Algorithmen mit C and Numerik-Algorithmen mit Fortran (7th ed., 1993, translated into English as Numerical Algorithms with Fortran and Numerical Algorithms with C, Springer, 1996).

Art
Engeln-Müllges's artworks are abstract, and include both paintings and cast-metal sculptures, based on her many years of work with artist . In 2019, she was one of the selected artists for the London Art Biennale.

Recognition
Engeln-Müllges was awarded the Federal Cross of Merit in 1992. In 2005, she was given an honorary doctorate by Nizhny Novgorod State Technical University.

References

External links
Academic home page
Personal home page

1940 births
Living people
Scientists from Leipzig
East German defectors
20th-century German mathematicians
Women mathematicians
German abstract artists
German women artists
RWTH Aachen University alumni
Recipients of the Cross of the Order of Merit of the Federal Republic of Germany
20th-century German women